María Elvira Pombo Holguín (born 1 June 1960) is a Colombian diplomat, and current Ambassador of Colombia to Portugal.

Prior to her appointment, she served as President of Proexport, the government agency responsible for the definition and execution of the strategy to fuel Colombia's economic growth through Trade, Tourism, and Foreign Direct Investment. She also served as Head of Proexport in Brazil, Colombian Consul-General in São Paulo, and Ambassador of Colombia to Brazil between 2010 and 2013. Also she was Permanent Representative of Colombia to the United Nations Industrial Development Organization.

After, she served as Ambassador of Colombia to Peru between 2013 and 2017 and as Ambassador of Colombia to Germany between 2017 and 2018.

She is the cousin of former Colombia's Minister of Foreign Affairs María Ángela Holguín.

References

1960 births
Living people
Holguín family
People from Bogotá
Ambassadors of Colombia to Brazil
Colombian women ambassadors
Ambassadors of Colombia to Peru
Ambassadors of Colombia to Germany
Ambassadors of Colombia to Portugal